Kendall Edwards (born February 18, 2001) is an American soccer player for the NC State Wolfpack.

Club career 
On April 8, 2018, Edwards appeared for Atlanta United 2, the USL affiliate of Atlanta United FC, starting in a 1-1 draw with Penn FC.

Edwards has committed to playing college soccer at North Carolina State University from 2019 and beyond.

International career 
Edwards has played for both the United States and Jamaican youth teams. He was called into a United States under-17 training camp in 2016, and represented the Jamaican under-17 squad in 2017 onward. On June 7, 2018, he was called up to the United States under-18's

References

External links

2001 births
Living people
American sportspeople of Jamaican descent
American soccer players
Association football defenders
Atlanta United 2 players
NC State Wolfpack men's soccer players
Jamaican footballers
Soccer players from Atlanta
USL Championship players